Urs Leuthold is a Swiss bobsledder who competed in the early 1980s. He won a gold medal in the two-man event at the 1983 FIBT World Championships in Lake Placid, New York.

References
Bobsleigh two-man world championship medalists since 1931

Living people
Swiss male bobsledders
Year of birth missing (living people)